The 2013 Night Train Tour was the fifth headlining concert tour by American country music artist Jason Aldean, in support of his fifth studio album Night Train. It played at stadiums and arenas across North America.

Background
Aldean held the first ever concert at Sanford Stadium on the campus of the University of Georgia on April 13, 2013.

On July 12, 2013, Aldean became the first country artist to ever headline Fenway Park. He sold out the historic park in seven minutes which is the quickest in the venue's history. Due to the quick sell-out he scheduled a second show for July 13, 2013.

Opening acts
 Thomas Rhett (All Year)
 Jake Owen (All Year)
 Luke Bryan (Sanford Stadium)
 Miranda Lambert (Fenway Park)
 Kelly Clarkson (Wrigley Field)

Setlist
The following set list is representative of the show on September 20, 2013. It is not representative of all concerts for the duration of the tour.

1. "Crazy Town"
2. "Take a Little Ride"
3. "Tattoos on This Town"
4. "When She Says Baby"
5. "The Truth"
6. "Fly Over States"
7. "Texas Was You"
8.  "Johnny Cash"
9.  "Amarillo Sky"
10. "Night Train
11. "1994"
12. "Don't You Wanna Stay"
13.  "Tennessee River"
14. "Big Green Tractor"
15. "The Only Way I Know
16. "Dirt Road Anthem"
17. "She's Country"

Encore;
18. "My Kinda Party"
19. "Hicktown"

Notes:
"Why" & "This Nothin Town" were also performed on select nights.
During "Don't You Wanna Stay" Aldean sang with a Kelly Clarkson hologram except in Chicago when Clarkson was a special guest.
On April 13, 2014, Ludacris performed "Dirt Road Anthem" with Aldean

Tour DVD
A live concert DVD entitled 'Night Train to Georgia' was released on October 15, 2013. Majority of the film was captured during Aldean's concert at Sanford Stadium on April 13, 2013. The film will include an 18-song set list that showcases 10 of his No. one hits. Also featured on the 90 minute DVD are personal interviews from Aldean, footage from his record-breaking Fenway Park and Wrigley Field stadium shows held in Summer 2013. There are also appearances by Kelly Clarkson, Luke Bryan and Ludacris as each of them joined him on stage.

Tour dates

Notes

References

2013 concert tours
Jason Aldean concert tours